A Day in the Life is an album by Jane Siberry, released in 1997. It was the second release on her own Sheeba Records label after leaving Reprise.

It is not a conventional album of songs, but a sound collage of yoga classes, phone messages, conversations, street sounds, and includes a wide cast of characters including cab drivers, and artists like Patty Larkin, Joe Jackson, k.d. lang, and Darol Anger, as well as excerpts from several songs.

Track listing

References

Jane Siberry albums
1997 albums
Sound collage albums